Golf was one of the many sports which was held at the 1994 Asian Games in Hiroshima, Japan between 6 and 9 October 1994.

Medalists

Medal table

Participating nations
A total of 61 athletes from 12 nations competed in golf at the 1994 Asian Games:

References
 New Straits Times, October 6–10, 1994
 Results

External links
 Olympic Council of Asia

 
1994 Asian Games events
1994
Asian Games
1994 Asian Games